The Nagsankar Temple is a famous shrine situated in nagsankar mouza near sootea, to the east of Tezpur, in Sonitpur District of Assam. The temple is believed to be built by King Narasankar of Nagakha in the 4th century.

Geography 

The exact history of the temple is not definite. It was built around 4th century AD.

History 

According to one belief, the Nagsankar temple was built by a King called Nag Sankar from Lohitya dynasty in the late 4th century. Nagsankar reigned eastern Kamarupa (ancient name of Assam) in 378 AD. He was a great king and sent his representatives to his contemporary the Great Asoka of Maurya dynasty.

According to another belief, the  temple was built by king Nagmatta. Nagmatta is another name of the powerful king of Assam, Arimatta. Arimatta has an important place in mythology too. He is believed to be the son of the river-god Brahmaputra, who blessed the beautiful wife of king Ramchandra with a son.

According to one myth related to Nagshankar temple when Shiva toured the universe taking the body of Sati the naval part fell in the Nagshankar temple. Therefore, the name of this temple was at first Navishankar and later on, it became Nagshankar. Such types of myths along with making more powerful the tradition increase social significance also. The songs, mantras, etc. related to the temples are not only the medium of entertainment; these give a message of knowledge to people regarding various duties, obligations, 
ethical ideals, etc. that are entrusted in the life cycle of people.

Ahom king Su-sen-pha repaired Nagsankar temple in 1480 With this work the king was able to spread his kingdom to the north bank of the river Brahmaputra and win the faith of the people of the region.

Management 

The temple is managed by the Nagsankar Mandir management committee formed by the people of Nagsankar and sootea.The Shiv ratri celebration is performed in a very grand way in this temple. Shiv ratri is observed by the local people for two days with various programmes and about five thousand pilgrims are always assembled at the temple premises during this time.

Transportation 

Commuting to Nagsankar Mandir is quite easy and convenient. It is located west of Sootea  .

Nagsankar is well connected by road, railways and air to the rest of the country. Regular bus services connect Nagsankar with Guwahati, Shillong, Aizawl, Agartala and Imphal through NH 37 and NH 53.

It is very well connected from Sootea to many major cities like Tezpur, Biswanath charali, Guwahati.

Cabs and private cars are easily available at the city for the airport.

Sights of Nagsankar Mandir

Nagsankar Mandir turtle 
Nag-Sankar Temple consists of  a large pond with more than five hundreds of rare variety of soft-shell turtles keep the temple environment always a visitor's attraction.

Nagshankar temple's pond have confirmed the presence of species — Nilssonia gangetica or Indian softshell turtle, classified as Vulnerable and the Chitra indica or South Asian narrow-headed softshell turtle, listed as Endangered by the IUCN.

See also 
Jamugurihat
Tezpur
Sootea

References

Hindu temples in Assam
Shiva temples in Assam
Hindu temples in India
Tezpur